Bryan William Dumesnil (born September 19, 1983) is a Canadian former professional baseball pitcher.

Career 
Dumesnil was a member of the Nanaimo Pirates of the B.C. Premier Baseball League.

Dumesnil was a member of Team Canada during the 2009 World Baseball Classic, although he did not enter either of Canada's two games during the preliminary stage of the tournament at the Rogers Centre in Toronto, Ontario, Canada.  He was also on Team Canada for the 2009 Baseball World Cup.

On February 2, 2011, he signed a contract with the Blue Crabs.

References

External links

1983 births
Living people
Aberdeen IronBirds players
Baseball people from British Columbia
Bluefield Orioles players
Canadian expatriate baseball players in the United States
Gulf Coast Dodgers players
Ogden Raptors players
Rome Braves players
Myrtle Beach Pelicans players
Mississippi Braves players
New Hampshire Fisher Cats players
Québec Capitales players
Southern Maryland Blue Crabs players
Sportspeople from Nanaimo
World Baseball Classic players of Canada
2009 World Baseball Classic players